Pandabeswar (also spelled Pandaveswar) is an administrative centre in Pandabeswar CD Block in Durgapur subdivision of Paschim Bardhaman district in the state of West Bengal, India.

Geography

Police station
Pandabeswar police station has jurisdiction over Pandabeswar CD Block. The area covered is 161 km2 and the population covered is 176,445.

CD Block HQ
The headquarters of Pandabeswar CD Block are located at Pandabeswar.

Urbanisation
As per the 2011 census, 79.22% of the population of Durgapur subdivision was urban and 20.78% was rural. Durgapur subdivision has 1 municipal corporation at Durgapur and 38 (+1 partly) census towns  (partly presented in the map alongside; all places marked on the map are linked in the full-screen map).

Demographics
Pandabeswar is shown as part of Baidyanathpur in the map of Pandabeswar CD Block  on page 243 of the District Census Handbook, Bardhaman, 2011. Separate demographic statistics are not available.

Economy
As per the Shodhganga website, collieries in the Pandaveswar Area of Eastern Coalfields are: Madaipur, Mandarbani, Nutandanga, Pandaveswar, Dalurbandh, Kendra, Samla, South Samla, Khottadih, Kankartala, Dalurbandh OCP, Palasthali OCP and Gangaramchak OCP.

As per ECL website telephone numbers, operational collieries in the Pandaveswar Area in 2018 are: Dalurband Colliery, Khottadih OCP, Khottadih UG, Madhaipur Colliery, Manderbony Colliery, Pandaveswar Colliery and South Samla Colliery.

Transport

There is a Railway station in Pandabeswar on the Andal-Sainthia branch line.

NH 14 (old number NH 60) passes through Pandabeswar.

Education
Pandaveswar College was established at Pandabeswar in 2005. It is affiliated with Kazi Nazrul University. It offers honours courses in Hindi, English, history and political science.

Healthcare
Pandabeswar Block Primary Health Centre, Pandabeswar CD block, with 10 beds, at Pandabeswar, is the major government medical facility in the Pandaveswar CD block.

Medical facilities (dispensaries) in the Pandaveswar Area of ECL are available at Pandaveswar Area PME Centre (PO Pandaveswar), Madhaipur (PO Nutundanga), Mandarboni (PO Nutundanga), South Samla (PO Pandaveswar), Pandaveswar (PO Pandaveswar), Dalurbandh (PO Pandaveswar), Khottadih (PO Khottadih), Area Dispensary (PO Pandaveswar).

References

Cities and towns in Paschim Bardhaman district